WOLV may refer to:

WOLV (FM), a radio station (97.7 FM) licensed to serve Houghton, Michigan, United States
WOLV Records, a Dutch independent house record label
WOLV-TV, the student station of the University of Michigan

See also
 
 Wolf (disambiguation)
 Wolves (disambiguation)